HD 106760 is a single-lined spectroscopic binary star system in the northern constellation of Coma Berenices. It is faintly visible to the naked eye, having an apparent visual magnitude of 4.99.

The variable radial velocity of HD 106760 was announced by W. W. Campbell of Lick Observatory in 1922, indicating the binary nature of this system. A preliminary orbit was determined by Mount Wilson Observatory astronomer W. H. Christie in 1936, then refined by English astronomer R. F. Griffin in 1984. The components of this system orbit each other with a period of 3.6 years and an eccentricity of 0.43.

The visible component has a stellar classification of K0.5 III–IIIb, indicating it is an evolved K-type giant star. It is around 1.6 billion years old with 1.9 times the mass of the Sun and has expanded to 17 times the Sun's radius. The star is radiating 112 times the Sun's luminosity from its enlarged photosphere at an effective temperature of 4,581 K.

References

K-type giants
Spectroscopic binaries
Coma Berenices
Durchmusterung objects
106760
059856
4668